Events from the year 1989 in South Korea.

Incumbents
President: Roh Tae-woo 
Prime Minister: Kang Young-hoon

Events

July 12: Lotte World, a major recreation complex in Seoul, South Korea, is opened to the public. It consists of the world's largest indoor amusement park.

July 27: Korean Air Flight 803

October 26: 10th anniversary of the assassination of Park Chung-hee.

Births
January 1 - Bae Geu-rin, actress
January 8 - Lee Yi-kyung, actor
January 10 - Solji, singer (EXID)
January 30 
Baek Sung-hyun, actor
Lee Gun-woo, singer
February 21 - Hong Yoo-jin, field hockey player
March 9 - Taeyeon, singer (Girls' Generation)
March 29 - Michelle Zauner, musician (Little Big League) (Japanese Breakfast)
April 18 - Jessica Jung, singer and actress
April 28 - Kim Sung-kyu, singer and actor
May 15 - Sunny, singer
May 31 - Daul Kim, model, painter and blogger (d. 2009)
July 28 - Amy Yang, golfer
August 1 - Tiffany Hwang, singer
September 16 - Hwang Seon-a, fencer
September 22 - Hyoyeon, singer (Girls' Generation)
November 22 - Gwon Han-na, handball player
December 5 - Yuri, singer (Girls' Generation)
December 13 - Chang Ye-na, badminton player
December 14 - Onew, singer and actor (SHINee)
December 27 - Kim Ha-na, badminton player

Deaths

November 14 - Choe Deok-sin, foreign minister and defector (b. 1914)

See also
List of South Korean films of 1989
Years in Japan
Years in North Korea

References

 
South Korea
Years of the 20th century in South Korea
1980s in South Korea
South Korea